In 1984 Ferro Carril Oeste won the Nacional, Argentinos Juniors won the Metropolitano and Independiente won the Copa Libertadores 1984.

Nacional 1984

Group stages
Group A

Group B

Group C

Group D

Group E

Group F

Group G

Group H

Knockout stages
2nd round

Quarter-final

Semi-final

Final

Ferro Carril Oeste qualified for the Copa Libertadores 1985 as champions of Nacional 1984

Top scorers

Metropolitano 1984

League table

Relegation table

Top scorers

Copa Libertadores 1984
Argentine teams in Copa Libertadores 1984
Independiente: Champions
Estudiantes de La Plata: 1st round

References

Argentina 1984 by Pablo Ciullini at rsssf.
Copa Libertadores 1984 by John Beuker at rsssf.

   

pl:I liga argentyńska w piłce nożnej (1984)